Sony Ericsson C702 is a mobile phone handset manufactured by Sony Ericsson. The phone features a 3.2-megapixel digital camera with LED flash and a few features such as geo-tagging and face detection. On the entertainment front, the phone has a media player supporting MP3, AAC/AAC+/eAAC+ and WMA music files and 3GP/MPEG-4 video files. The phone also features a RDS FM radio, and a Memory Stick Micro (M2) slot for expandable solid state memory (up to 16GB theoretically - officially up to 4GB)

As with many other phones in the C-series, this phone also has several different versions. The C702i is the international version (thus the i) and it supports GSM/GPRS/EDGE 850 / 900 / 1800 / 1900 and UMTS / HSDPA 2100 network and the C702c (China Mainland version) and C702a (American version) only support GSM 850/900/1800/1900 MHz. Since the C702i does support 3G (and HSDPA or sometimes called 3G+), it comes with a QCIF (176X144) resolution front-mounted camera for 3G video conferencing. According to the official Sony Ericsson specifications, the C702's talk time drops steeply from around 6 hours 30 minutes when using GSM to about 2 hours 30 minutes whilst using UMTS.

Technical specifications

Imaging
 3.2-megapixel digital camera with auto-focus and Macro mode
 LED flash
 Shutter button with auto-focus (press half-way to auto-focus, fully to capture)
 Panorama - takes 3 VGA images of a landscape and then puts them into one picture
 Geo-tagging - adds the information about where the pictures were taken.
 Burst - takes 4 successive images of the same subject in VGA resolution to choose the best shot(s)
 QCIF (176x144) resolution video recording at 15 frames per second in 3GP format

Network
 Dual-mode: UMTS / HSDPA at 2100 MHz, and GSM/GPRS/EDGE at 850 MHz, 900 MHz, 1800 MHz and 1900 MHz.

Price
Around $200.

Entertainment
 Media play with Equalizer, Stereo Widening and MegaBass™
 MP3, WMA, RealAudio 8 and AAC/AAC+/eAAC+ audio
 MP4 and 3GP
 RDS FM radio
 MusicDJ, PhotoDJ and VideoDJ
 Sound recorder (saves records in AMR format)
 Streaming audio/video
 3D Java games
 FaceWarp (pre-installed Java Application, not in all models)
 Remote Control application allows you to use your phone as a Human interface device (like mouse or keyboard) via Bluetooth. Three button presets available: Presenter, MediaPlayer, Desktop. Supported on host computer natively by Bluetooth stack (vendor-independent).

Internet
 Access NetFront - Full HTML browser
 Download Manager
 Native RSS Reader
 Email (POP3 and IMAP4). With Push e-mail available for IMAP4.

Connectivity
 Bluetooth 2.0 + A2DP
 CSD
 HSDPA
 GPRS
 EDGE
 USB 2.0 Synchronization or Mass Storage Device Transfer Mode via Fast Port connector
 GPS

Storage
  (M2) (Card not included as standard, up to 4 GB supported officially - unofficially up to 16 GB)
 Up to 160 MB Internal Flash memory

Dimensions
 106.0 × 48.0 × 16.0 mm / 4.2 × 1.9 × 0.6 inches

Display
 2.2 inch QVGA (240x320) TFT LCD
 262,144 color TFT display

Colors
 Cool Cyan
 Speed Black
 Energy Black

Specific absorption rate (SAR)
 1.00 W/kg (right)

References

Cyber-shot cameras
Sony Ericsson mobile phones
Mobile phones introduced in 2008